Vasum lactisfloris is a rare species of medium-sized predatory sea snail, a marine gastropod mollusk in the family Turbinellidae, subfamily Vasinae, the vase snails.

Description
The lenth of the shell attains 77 mm.
.

Distribution
This marine species occurs off Somalia.

References

 Angeletti S. & Ferrario M. (1983). La piu grande encyclopedia delle conchiglie di tutto il mondo. Peruzzo. 2 volumes.

External links
 

lactisfloris
Taxa named by Jean-Baptiste Lamarck
Gastropods described in 1983